'Margaret Tracey Lynes RGN, BSc (hons), MA, LLM (born 19 February 1963) is a female English former Shot putter and Weightlifter.

Athletics career
Lynes represented England in the shot put at the Commonwealth Games in 1994 and 1998, and Great Britain at the 1994 European Championships. She won a total of 22 medals at AAA, UK and AAA Indoor Championships between 1986 and 1998, including twice winning the AAA Indoor Championships title (1993/94), finishing second at the 1993 UK Championships, and second at the 1995 AAA Championships.

Weightlifting career
Lynes also competed for Great Britain in weightlifting, and was one of the pioneers of women's competitive weightlifting. She was a triple gold medallist at the first EEC weightlifting championships and went on to win a total of six European Championship medals, including two gold medals in the Clean and Jerk. She narrowly missed a medal in the Clean and Jerk at the 1989 World championships, finishing fourth by virtue of a slightly heavier body-weight.

Lynes went on to compete for England in weightlifting at the 2002 Commonwealth Games, where she finished 6th, becoming the first English athlete to compete in two different sports at the Commonwealth Games.

She was appointed England team manager for the weightlifting squad at the 2010 and 2014 Commonwealth Games.

International competitions

References

1963 births
Athletes (track and field) at the 1994 Commonwealth Games
Athletes (track and field) at the 1998 Commonwealth Games
Living people
Commonwealth Games competitors for England
English female shot putters
English female weightlifters
Weightlifters at the 2002 Commonwealth Games